Edward Corrie and Daniel Smethurst were the defending champions, however Smethurst chose not to participate. Corrie partnered Frederik Nielsen but lost in the first round.

Ross William Guignon and Tim Kopinski won the title, defeating Frank Dancevic and Adil Shamasdin in the final, 7–6(7–2), 6–2.

Seeds

Draw

Draw

References
 Main Draw

JSM Challenger of Champaign-Urbana
JSM Challenger of Champaign–Urbana